Frederick Bausman was an early coal mining operator in Allegheny County, Pennsylvania.  Born in Pittsburgh in 1825, he was the son of Doctor Frederick Bausman and Sarah Beltzhoover.

Libel Charges
In 1890, he filed criminal libel charges against Giuseppi Carusi, for a circular he published about his wife, the former Virginia Knox, and Frederick's half-sister.

References

1825 births
1908 deaths
People from Pittsburgh
Pittsburgh metropolitan area
History of Pittsburgh